Ben Morrison is an American stand-up comedian, entertainer, TV personality and actor.

Morrison is a 10-year vet of the stand-up scene and can be seen as Ashton Kutcher’s right-hand-man in the final season of MTV's show Punk’d, now airing on MTV and MTV2. In addition, he is seen on NBC’s Last Comic Driving and most recently played comedian Robert Schimel's son in the pilot HOBOS for FOX.

Morrison is also the lead and creator of THOUGHTROCKET, a series for Al Gore’s CurrentTV, and his multimedia one-man show Signs finished its run at the Comedy Central Stage. In addition, his previous one-man show Pain in the Ass continues performances throughout the US and Canada for its fifth year.

Morrison was diagnosed with Crohn's disease when he was 19 years old.

References

http://benmorrison.org/category/crohns-advocate/

External links

American male comedians
21st-century American comedians
Living people
Place of birth missing (living people)
Year of birth missing (living people)
American male actors